KRSV-FM (98.7 FM) is a radio station broadcasting an adult contemporary music format. Licensed to Afton, Wyoming, United States, the station is currently owned by Dan and Kim Dockstader, through licensee SVI Media, Inc., and began broadcasting adult contemporary music on a new station to the area called Swift 98, beginning May 4, 2016 .

Previous logo
  (KRSV-FM's logo under previous AM/FM country simulcast)

References

External links

RSV-FM
Mainstream adult contemporary radio stations in the United States
Lincoln County, Wyoming
Radio stations established in 1975